Border Patrol is a New Zealand reality television series, focusing on the work at New Zealand's borders of New Zealand Customs Service, the Ministry for Primary Industries, and Immigration New Zealand. The series also features appearances by staff from the Department of Conservation. The first season premiered in 2004 and it is an original New Zealand concept which has now been replicated throughout the world. In 2006, Border Patrol was the winner of the Best Reality Series at the New Zealand Screen Awards. It is narrated by Tim Balme.

Border Patrol is very popular in New Zealand, and regularly wins its timeslot with usually more than 500,000 viewers per episode. In fact, in January 2012, Border Patrol repeats were screened every night on TV One at 7pm, and in one week it was the most watched show every day, reaching a peak of more than 830,000 viewers during the episode that screened on 9 January.

International broadcasting

 In Australia, the series airs under the name Border Patrol (sometimes referred to in on-air promos as Border Patrol NZ to more clearly distinguish it from Border Security) on Channel Seven.
 In the United Kingdom, the series was briefly aired under the name Passport Patrol on Sky Living/Pick TV before later using its original title.
 In Sweden, the series airs under the name Gränsbevakarna Nya Zeeland, on Kanal 9.
 In the United States, the series aired under the name Border Patrol on the National Geographic Channel and was previously available to watch on Netflix, but has been removed as of October 2019.
 In Ireland, the series airs under the name Passport Patrol on Sky Living.
 In Denmark, the series airs under the name Border Patrol on 6'eren.
 In Norway, the series airs under the name Grensevakten New Zealand on TVNorge.
 In Italy it is broadcast on DMAX as Airport Security: Nuova Zelanda

See also
Biosecurity in New Zealand
 Border Security: Australia's Front Line
Television in New Zealand

References

External links
 at TVNZ

New Zealand reality television series
2004 New Zealand television series debuts
Television series by Greenstone TV
Borders of New Zealand
Television series about border control